Russell Martingell (details of birth and death unknown) was an English cricketer who was associated with Surrey and made his first-class debut in 1828. His son was Will Martingell.

References

Year of birth unknown
Year of death unknown
English cricketers
English cricketers of 1826 to 1863
Surrey cricketers